Buckheart Township is one of twenty-six townships in Fulton County, Illinois, USA.  As of the 2010 census, its population was 1,484 and it contained 709 housing units.

Geography

Cities, towns, villages
 Canton (partial)
 Dunfermline
 St. David
 Bryant
 Hooty (small mining community which no longer exists).

Major highways
  Illinois Route 95
  Illinois Route 97
  Illinois Route 100

Lakes
 Fisher Lake
 Frog Lake
 Long Lake
 Mason Lake
 Rose Lake
 Stevens Lake
 Swimming Lake
 Traer Lake
 Woods Lake

Demographics

School districts
 Community Unit School District 3 Fulton City
 Lewistown School District 97

Political districts
 Illinois's 17th congressional district
 State House District 91
 State Senate District 46

References
 
 United States Census Bureau 2007 TIGER/Line Shapefiles
 United States National Atlas

External links
 City-Data.com
 Illinois State Archives

Townships in Fulton County, Illinois
Townships in Illinois